Jared Bernhardt (born September 12, 1997) is an American football wide receiver for the Atlanta Falcons of the National Football League (NFL). He previously played college lacrosse at Maryland where he won the Tewaaraton Award as the nation's best player followed by one season of college football as quarterback at Ferris State.

Early life and high school
Bernhardt grew up in Longwood, Florida. His father, Jim, was a football coach at Hofstra, Brown, Central Florida, and Penn State and was the director of football research for the Houston Texans. Bernhardt attended Lake Brantley High School, where he played football and lacrosse. In football, he played quarterback in a triple-option offense and rushed 1,457 yards and 12 touchdowns and passed for 751 yards and six touchdowns in 11 games as a senior. Bernhardt was an All-American midfielder in lacrosse at Lake Brantley and committed to play collegiately at the University of Maryland as a sophomore.

College career

Bernhardt was a member of the Maryland Terrapins men's lacrosse team for five seasons. As a freshman, he was a starting midfielder on the Terrapins' 2017 national championship team. His senior season was canceled after six games due to COVID-19. Bernhardt returned for a fifth season and won the Tewaaraton Award as the nation's best collegiate lacrosse player. He left Maryland as the school's career leader in goals with 202 and points with 290.

Following the death of his father in 2019, Bernhardt decided that he would utilize the NCAA's "five to play four" rule, which allows athletes one year of eligibility in another sport after they have exhausted eligibility in their primary sport, and play college football. He committed to play quarterback at Ferris State for the 2020 season, but the Division II football season was canceled due to COVID-19 and he stayed at Maryland for an additional season of lacrosse. Bernhardt enrolled at Ferris State as a graduate transfer in the summer of 2021 and was named the team's starting quarterback. In his only season of college football, Bernhardt passed for 1,322 yards and 11 touchdowns while rushing for 1,421 yards and 26 touchdowns and was named the Great Lakes Intercollegiate Athletic Conference Player of the Year as the Bulldogs went 14–0 and won the 2021 NCAA Division II Football Championship Game. In the game, he didn't attempt a pass and rushed 14 times for 148 yards and three touchdowns in the 58–17 win over Valdosta State.

Professional career
Bernhardt participated in Maryland's pro day on March 30, 2022. On April 7, 2022, Bernhardt visited the Denver Broncos for a top-30 visit.

Bernhardt was signed by the Atlanta Falcons as an undrafted free agent on April 30, 2022, shortly after the conclusion of the 2022 NFL Draft. He made the Falcons' initial 53-man roster out of training camp. On October 22, 2022, Bernhardt was placed on injured reserve with a groin injury.

References

External links
 Atlanta Falcons bio
Maryland Terrapins lacrosse bio
Ferris State Bulldogs football bio

Living people
Players of American football from Florida
American football quarterbacks
Ferris State Bulldogs football players
Maryland Terrapins men's lacrosse players
People from Longwood, Florida
Lake Brantley High School alumni
Sportspeople from Seminole County, Florida
American lacrosse players
Lacrosse midfielders
Atlanta Falcons players
1997 births